The 2017 FIBA Asia Under-16 Championship for Women was the qualifying tournament for FIBA Asia at the 2018 FIBA Under-17 World Championship for Women. Originally slated to be held at Hyderabad, the tournament venue was moved and held in Bengaluru, India from October 22 to 28.

 stormed back from a 13-point deficit in the third quarter to eke out a come-from-behind 61–60 win against  in the Finals, notching their first-ever championship in the tournament. Meanwhile, dethroned defending champions  salvaged the bronze medal after dispatching , 60–43.

All these teams will represent FIBA Asia to the next year's FIBA U17 Women's World Cup to be held in Belarus.

Venues

Qualified teams 
For Division A:
Semifinalists of the 2015 FIBA Asia Under-16 Championship for Women:

Qualifying round winners at the 2015 FIBA Asia Under-16 Championship for Women:

Teams from FIBA Oceania:

For Division B:
The host nation, being relegated to Division B at the previous championship:

Early registrants for the Division B slots from FIBA Asia:

Competition format

The tournament composed of two divisions, Division A and Division B.

For each division, during the Group Phase, eight participating teams were divided into two groups (A and B) of four teams each. Each team played all the other teams in its own group (a total of three games for each team), and all four teams in each group advanced to their division's Quarter-finals. A total of twelve games were played in the Group Phase.

During the Final Phase, Quarter-finals games were decided on the ranking of the participating teams in the Group Phase:

Game 13: 1st A v 4th B
Game 14: 2nd B v 3rd B
Game 15: 3rd A v 2nd B
Game 16: 4th A v 1st B

For Division A, the four winners advanced to the Semi-finals and to the 2018 FIBA Under-17 World Championship for Women.

Meanwhile, the four losing quarterfinalists went on to play 5th-8th Classification Games wherein the two winners advanced to play 5-6 Classification Game, while the two losers played 7-8 Classification Game

During the Semi-Finals, the four teams played as follows:

Game 21: Winner of Game 13 v Winner of Game 14
Game 22: Winner of Game 15 v Winner of Game 16

In determining the Champions and the Third Place winner, the four teams played as follows:

Game 23: Loser of Game 21 v Loser of Game 22
Game 24: Winner of Game 21 v Winner of Game 22

For Division B, the Champions will earn the right to be promoted to the next championship, replacing the last-placed (eighth placer) team from Division A.

Divisions
Division A will include teams that won in the 2015 qualifying round and the semifinalists of the previous championship. FIBA Oceania teams  and  will compete in the tournament for the first time and will be placed in the same division.

Included were the FIBA World Rankings prior to the draw.

Squads

Division A
All times are local (UTC+05:30)

Preliminary round

Group A

Group B

Knockout round

Bracket

5th place bracket

Quarterfinals

5–8th place semifinals

Semifinals

Seventh place game

Fifth place game

Third place game

Final

Final standing

Division B
All times are local (UTC+05:30)

Preliminary round

Group A

Group B

Knockout round

Bracket

5th place bracket

Quarterfinals

5–8th place semifinal

Semifinals

Fifth place game

Third place game

Final

Final standing

Statistical leaders

Players

Points

Rebounds

Steals

Assists

Blocks

Other statistical leaders

Teams

Points

Rebounds

Assists

Steals

Blocks

Other statistical leaders

References

External links
 2017 FIBA Asia Under-16 Championship for Women

2017
2017 in women's basketball
2017–18 in Asian basketball
2017
Bask
basketball
Basketball in Bangalore
October 2017 sports events in Asia